James Tracy may refer to:
James Tracy (historian) (born 1938), American historian 
James Tracy (communication scholar) (born 1965), American academic, communication scholar, and conspiracy theorist
James Tracy (activist) (born 1970), American writer and political activist
James Tracy (rugby union) (born 1991), Irish rugby union player

See also
Jim Tracy (disambiguation)
James Tracy Hale (1810–1865), member of the U.S. House of Representatives from Pennsylvania